Naralokaviran, also known as Kalinga Rayan, was a general in the Chola army during the reign of Kulottunga I (1070 – 1120) and his successor Vikrama Chola (1118 – 1135). He was the headman of Arumbakkam and a resident of Manavil in Manavil Nadu in Tondai Mandalam. He maintained a large fief at Manavil.  Naralokaviran led many Chola campaigns in the deep south and distinguished himself in the Pandya Wars. He had many titles like Madurantaka Ponnambala-koothar, Sabharnataka, Kalinga Rayan, Porkoyil-Tondaiman, Koothan, Tondaiyarkon, the Lion of Kalinga. 

Naralokaviran is also known for subduing the rebelling Chera Perumal king of Kerala for his Chola overlord. The port of Quilon was recovered by the Pandya-Chola forces in c. 1097 AD. However, the Chera Perumals were able to recover Quilon-Trivandrum-Nagercoil region around 1100/02 AD (and thus fixing the southern limit of the country at Kottar). These losses were later (c. 1102 - c. 1118) recovered by Jatavarman Parakrama Pandya for Vikrama Chola.

Family 

A son of the general called Surainayakan alias Madhavarayan is known to us from inscriptions. He, too, served as an officer under Vikrama Chola.

Religious contributions 

Naralokaviran is known for a number of benefactions to Nataraja Temple in Chidambaram. He was responsible for the construction of two large temple gateways and for the expansion of the goddess shrine within the temple complex. He took interest in festivals and made contributions for the provision of lamps on the processional routes, watering the streets during the festivals, a bull vehicle for the deity to ride during the Bhikshatana procession and a bugle inlaid with gold to herald the arrival of god Siva. During the reign of Vikrama Chola, Naralokaviran built the hundred-pillar hall and named it after his overlord.

Inscriptions 

Naralokaviran figures in many inscriptions of Kulottunga I (1070 – 1120) and his successor Vikrama Chola (1118 – 1135)

 Earliest reference: An inscription dated to of the 28th regnal year of Kulottunga I (1098 AD) (begins with Pugal madu) from Neyvanai in South Arcot district states that some lands were renamed as Sungamtavirtta-sola-nallur (after the king) and were donated to Porkudangudutta-aruliyadeva at Tirunelvennai upon request by the general. 
 Naralokaviran continued to serve Kulottunga's successor Vikrama Chola  (1118 – 1135) as well. He figures in an inscription of the 4th regnal year of Vikrama Chola (begins with Pumadu Punara) from Tiruvarur that states that he bought some lands from the sabha of Tirunallur for providing garlands of red lilies to the Sri-mulasthanam udaiyar (god) of Tiruvarur.
 Latest reference: Another inscription of the 6th regnal year of Vikrama Chola (begins with Pumadu Punara) from Tribhuvani (Pondicherry) states that the general set up some land for a temple site, a hall and a flower garden and dedicated it to Arulakara-Iswaram udaiyar for the prosperity of the king and the village.
He is the subject of a bilingual metrical composition in Sanskrit and Tamil, an excerpt as follows:

References

See also 
Karunakara Tondaiman
Chola
Tondaiman

Chola dynasty
Year of birth unknown